The Santo Stefano lizard (Podarcis siculus sanctistephani) lived on Santo Stefano Island, a small island near Ventotene in the Tyrrhenian sea off the west coast of Italy, and part of the Pontine Islands. It became extinct in 1965, probably caused by feral cats and a snake species. These animals destroyed almost the whole population and any survivors seem to have interbred with an introduced subspecies. An epidemic of an unknown pathogen that followed wiped out the majority of the population and contributed to this subspecies' extinction.

See also 
 List of extinct animals of Europe

References 
 David Day, 1981, The Doomsday Book of Animals, Ebury Press, London.

External links 
 The Sixth Extinction - Santo Stefano Lizard

Podarcis
Extinct reptiles
Endemic fauna of Italy
Extinct animals of Europe
Lizards of Europe
Reptile extinctions since 1500
Tyrrhenian Sea
Taxa named by Robert Mertens